Ali Sabry is the former Egyptian minister of military production. He was sworn into Prime Minister Hesham Qandil's cabinet, the Qandil Cabinet, on 2 August 2012, following the 2011–2012 Egyptian uprising that deposed President Hosni Mubarak. He is one of the independent ministers in the cabinet.

Political career
Sabry was appointed minister of military production by former Egyptian premier Kamal Ganzouri in the interim government in December 2011. On 2 August 2012, Sabry was sworn in as part of the Qandil Cabinet, retaining his post as minister of military production.

References

Living people
People of the Egyptian revolution of 2011
Qandil Cabinet
Military production ministers of Egypt
Year of birth missing (living people)